Irish Coffee is a Canadian talk show television series which aired on CBC Television from 1969 to 1970.

Premise
This Toronto-produced series was recorded on location at Julie's, a restaurant on Jarvis Street located across from the primary CBC facilities. Discussions were informal, frequently involving humorous stories. Episodes were hosted by one of Fred Davis, Paul Kligman, Paul Soles and Bill Walker, featuring such guests as Andrew Allan, Ray Sonin, Ben Wicks and Peter Worthington.

Scheduling
This half-hour series was broadcast on Wednesdays at 10:30 p.m. (Eastern) from 24 September 1969 to 28 January 1970. The series was cancelled due to insufficient viewership and negative critical reception.

References

External links
 
 

CBC Television original programming
1969 Canadian television series debuts
1970 Canadian television series endings